"Standing Ovation" is a song written and performed by GQ. It reached #12 on the U.S. R&B chart and #35 on the U.S. dance chart in 1980. The song was featured on their 1980 album, Two.

The song was produced by Jimmy Simpson.

References

1980 songs
1980 singles
GQ (band) songs
Arista Records singles